Azerbaijan State Agricultural University (literally "Azerbaijan State Agricultural University"), also referred to as the Azerbaijan State Agricultural University (Az. AA), is a public university located in Ganja, Azerbaijan.  The university has eight schools, 3830 students and 560 faculty members.  In addition, there is a teaching site in Gazakh with nearly 500 correspondent students.

History
Azerbaijan State Agricultural University traces its history to the Baku Polytechnical Institute's Department of Agriculture, which was established on November 14, 1920.  Originally located in Baku, the school was original formed in 1920 after the invasion of the Red Army and the establishment of the fledgling Azerbaijan SSR.  The new government decreed that the previous technical school, Baku Polytechnicum, would close and be replaced by Baku Polytechnical Institute, a more traditional polytechnic institute.  The new school focused on training engineers in a broad range of industries: agriculture, civil engineering, electromechanical, economics and oil.  The new school went through many name changes over the years as its emphasis changed to meet the needs of Azerbaijan.  In 1923 the school changed its name to Azerbaijan Polytechnical Institute.  In March 1929, the Azerbaijan Communist Party decreed that the school be split into three independent schools covering agriculture, economics and oil.

Today the university is the only state school in Azerbaijan that offers a university-level degree for the agricultural sector.

Ex-rector Məmmədtağı İbrahim oğlu Cəfərov  died and his replacement was appointed on November 21, 2008

Building 
The main building of Azerbaijan State Agricultural University located at 276 Atatürk Street, was built in 1897. “Zemstvo” office called DUMA was settled there. In 1908 the building was turned into the residence of the Governor of Ganja Governorate. Azerbaijan Democratic Republic operated in this building in 1918 when the capital was Ganja. The meetings of the Parliament of ADR were held in this building formerly. The ADR museum is located in the nearby building built in the ancient historical-architectural style.

See also 
 Ganja, Azerbaijan
 Azerbaijan Technical University

References

External links 
 Official website of Azerbaijan State Agricultural University 

Buildings and structures in Ganja, Azerbaijan
Universities and institutes established in the Soviet Union
Universities in Ganja
Science and technology in Azerbaijan
Educational institutions established in 1929
 
1929 establishments in the Soviet Union